"Ice" was a hit for The Ritchie Family on the Billboard dance chart in 2016. It featured two of the original members and a new member.

Background
The single was released in July 2016 on Martha Wash's Purple Rose Records label. It was composed by Zach Adam and produced by Martha Wash's Purple Rose label team. The singers on this recording were Cassandra Wooten, Cheryl Mason-Dorman and Renée Guillory-Wearing. This was their first hit in nearly 40 years and it reached No. 40 on the Billboard dance chart in November 2016.

Versions
The song was later remixed and released as a maxi-single of six tracks. Remixes were done by  Chris Cox and Moto Blanco.

References

External links
 Global News Wire, November 11, 2016 - 40 Years Later, The Ritchie Family Is Back on Billboard's Dance Club Chart
 HuffPost, 31 January 2017 - 1970s Disco Group, The Ritchie Family is Back ‘…in Town’ - Peter “Souleo” Wright
 The Ritchie Family - Ice (Official Lyric Video)

2016 singles
The Ritchie Family songs